Sculpsitechinus is a genus of sand dollars within the family Astriclypeidae. There are currently 3 species assigned to the genus, with members being found near Africa, Asia, and Australia in the Pacific and Indian Ocean.

Species 

 Sculpsitechinus auritus 
 Sculpsitechinus iraniensis 
 Sculpsitechinus tenuissimus

References 

Astriclypeidae
Echinoidea genera